Mopa-Muro is a Local Government Area in Kogi State, Nigeria. Its headquarters are in the town of Mopa on the A123 highway.
 

The postal code of the area is 261.

References

Local Government Areas in Kogi State